Natália Pedro da Costa Umbelina Neto (3 November 1951) is a politician from São Tomé and Príncipe, who served as the country's minister for foreign affairs between 2012 and 2014.

Biography 

Between 1990 and 1999, Umbelina Neto was Secretary General of the UNESCO National Commission in São Tomé and Príncipe. 

In 2007, she obtained a PhD in history from the University of Aix-Marseille with a study of the socio-economics of São Tomé and Príncipe between 1853 and 1903.

She was regional secretary for social and institutional affairs in the regional government of the island of Príncipe from 2010 to 2012.

She was Minister of Foreign Affairs, Cooperation and Communities from 2012 to 2014.

References 

1951 births
Foreign Ministers of São Tomé and Príncipe
Women government ministers of São Tomé and Príncipe
Female foreign ministers
21st-century women politicians
São Tomé and Príncipe women diplomats
Women ambassadors
Living people
21st-century São Tomé and Príncipe politicians